Franklin Gore Jr. (born March 13, 2002) is an American football running back for the Southern Miss Golden Eagles. He is the son of former NFL running back Frank Gore.

Early life and high school career
The son of former National Football League (NFL) player Frank Gore, he was born on March 13, 2002, in Miami, Florida. Gore Jr. attended Miami Killian Senior High School, where he played quarterback and running back. As a rusher, Gore compiled 1,111 yards and thirteen touchdowns on 113 carries in his senior year.

College career
Though originally committing to Florida Atlantic, Gore flipped his commitment to Southern Miss. As a true freshman, he led the school with 708 rushing yards on 121 carries, a 5.9 average. He posted three 100-yard games, against North Texas, North Alabama, and Florida Atlantic. He scored a 51-yard rushing touchdown in a 20–23 loss against UTSA. He was named second-team all-conference following the season, as well as all-freshman. Through the first ten games of his second season, Gore compiled 731 rushing yards on 162 carries, scoring two touchdowns. He was named quarterback prior to a week eleven game against Louisiana Tech, and threw two touchdowns, leading the team to their second victory of the season. In the 2022 Lending Tree Bowl against Rice, Gore rushed for 328 yards, an FBS bowl game record. He also scored three touchdowns in the game, two rushing and one passing.

References

External links
Southern Miss Golden Eagles bio

2002 births
Living people
Players of American football from Miami
American football running backs
Southern Miss Golden Eagles football players